Cypraeidae, commonly named the cowries ( cowry), is a taxonomic family of small to large sea snails. These are marine gastropod mollusks in the superfamily Cypraeoidea, the cowries and cowry allies.

Shell description
Cypraeidae have adult shells which are very rounded, almost like an egg; they do not look like a typical gastropod shell. In virtually all of the species in the family Cypraeidae, the shells are extremely smooth and shiny. This is because in the living animal, the shell is nearly always fully covered with the mantle.

Typically, no spire is visible in the fully adult shell, and there is a long, narrow, aperture which is lined with "teeth".

Juvenile cowry shells are not at all similar to adult cowry shells. The juvenile shells of cowries perhaps more closely resemble the shells of some "bubble snails" in the order Cephalaspidea. Also the shells of juvenile cowries seldom exhibit the same color patterns as the adult shells do, and thus can be hard to identify to species.

Cowries have no operculum.

Predators and prey
The very narrow toothed aperture of the cowry shell makes the adult shells difficult for many predators to reach into. However cowries are still vulnerable to predation:

 Some tropical crustaceans can break the dorsum of a cowry shell.
 Some mollusc-eating cones, such as Conus textile, can inject venom into the cowry's flesh. The cone then extends its stomach into the shell, through the aperture, to completely ingest the flesh.
 Some octopuses can gouge a small hole (using a special barb/tooth and an acidic secretion) through the shell to inject a venom that kills the animal within.
The eating habits of cowries are poorly known, because most species are nocturnal and cryptic, but sponges are the most commonly described prey.  Off the coasts of Australia, common cowry species eat sponges, and on Caribbean coral reefs they are known to eat sponges that are otherwise chemically defended against other predators.

Taxonomy
For nearly 200 years, every species in the family Cypraeidae was placed in one genus, Cypraea, but in 2002  the cowries were divided into many different genera.

2005 taxonomy 
The family Cypraeidae belongs, together with the family Ovulidae, to the superfamily Cypraeoidea. This, in turn, is part of the clade Littorinimorpha which belongs within the clade Hypsogastropoda according to the taxonomy of Bouchet & Rocroi (2005).

The following six subfamilies have been recognized in the taxonomy of Bouchet & Rocroi (2005) but are treated as alternate representation of Cypraeidae in the World Register of Marine Species :
 Cypraeinae Rafinesque, 1815
 tribe Cypraeini Rafinesque, 1815 - synonym: Porcellanidae Roberts, 1870 (inv.)
 tribe Mauritiini Steadman & Cotton, 1946
 Erosariinae Schilder, 1924 - synonyms: Cypraeacitinae Schilder, 1930 (inv.); Nariinae Schilder, 1932; Staphylaeinae Iredale, 1935
 Erroneinae Schilder, 1927
 tribe Erroneini Schilder, 1927 - synonym: Adustinae Steadman & Cotton, 1946
 tribe Bistolidini C. Meyer, 2003
 Gisortiinae Schilder, 1927 - synonyms: Archicypraeinae Schilder, 1930; Bernayinae Schilder, 1927; Cpraeorbini Schilder, 1927; Mandolininae Schilder, 1932; Umbiliini Schilder 1932; Zoilinae Iredale, 1935
 Luriinae Schilder, 1932
 tribe Luriini Schilder, 1932 - synonym: Talpariinae Iredale, 1935
 tribe Austrocypraeini Iredale, 1935
 Pustulariinae Gill, 1871
 tribe Pustulariini Gill, 1871
 tribe Cypraeovulini Schilder, 1927
Zonariinae F. A. Schilder, 1932
 Tribe Pseudozonariini Lopez Soriano, 2006
 tribe Zonariini Schilder, 1932

Genera 
Genera within the family Cypraeidae include:

 Subfamily Cypraeinae Rafinesque, 1815
 Cypraea Linnaeus, 1758
 † Cypraeorbis Timothy Abbott Conrad, 1865
 Muracypraea Woodring, 1957
 † Siphocypraea Heilprin, 1887

 Subfamily Erosariinae Schilder, 1924
 Cryptocypraea Meyer, 2003
 Ipsa Jousseaume, 1884
 Monetaria Troschel, 1863
 Naria Gray, 1837
 Nesiocypraea Azuma & Kurohara, 1967
 Nucleolaria Oyama, 1959
 † Palaeocypraea Schilder, 1928
 Perisserosa Iredale, 1930
 † Praerosaria Dolin & Lozouet, 2004
 Propustularia Schilder, 1927
 Staphylaea Jousseaume, 1884
 † Subepona Dolin & Lozouet, 2004
 Subfamily Erroneinae Schilder, 1927
 Bistolida Cossmann, 1920
 Erronea Troschel, 1863
 Subfamily † Gisortiinae Schilder, 1927
 † Afrocypraea Schilder, 1932
 † Archicypraea Schilder, 1926
 † Bernaya Jousseaume, 1884
 † Garviea Dolin & Dockery, 2018
 † Gisortia Jousseaume, 1884
 † Mandolina Jousseaume, 1884
 † Protocypraea Schilder, 1927
 † Semicypraea Schilder, 1927
 † Vicetia Fabiani 1905
 Subfamily Luriinae Schilder, 1932
 Tribe Austrocypraeini Iredale, 1935
 Annepona Iredale, 1935
 Arestorides Iredale 1930
 Austrocypraea Cossmann, 1903
 Callistocypraea Schilder, 1927
 Chelycypraea Schilder, 1927
 Lyncina Troschel, 1863
 Raybaudia Lorenz, 2017
 Trona Jousseaume, 1884
 Tribe Luriini Schilder, 1932
 † Fossacypraea Schilder, 1939 
 † Jousseaumia Sacco, 1894 
 Luria Jousseaume, 1884
 Talparia Troschel, 1863
 Subfamily Pustulariinae Gill, 1871
 Cypraeovula Gray, 1824
 Pustularia Swainson, 1840

 Subfamily Umbiliinae Schilder, 1932
 † Gigantocypraea Schilder, 1927
 Umbilia Jousseaume, 1884

 Subfamily Zonariinae F. A. Schilder, 1932
 Tribe Pseudozonariini Lopez Soriano, 2006
 Neobernaya Schilder 1927
 Pseudozonaria Schilder, 1929
 Plaziatia Dolin & Lozouet, 2004 accepted as Pseudozonaria Schilder, 1929
 tribe Zonariini Schilder, 1932
 Proadusta Sacco, 1894 †
 Prozonarina Schilder, 1941 †
 Schilderina Dolin & Aguerre, 2020
 Zonaria Jousseaume, 1884
 † Zonarina Sacco, 1894
 Schilderia Tomlin, 1930

 Not assigned to a subfamily
 Austrasiatica Lorenz, 1989
 Barycypraea Schilder, 1927
 Blasicrura Iredale, 1930
 Contradusta Meyer, 2003
 Cribrarula Strand, 1929
 Eclogavena Iredale, 1930
 Ficadusta Habe & Kosuge 1966
 Leporicypraea Iredale, 1930
 Macrocypraea Schilder, 1930
 Mauritia Troschel, 1863
 Melicerona Iredale, 1930
 † Miolyncina
 Notadusta Schilder, 1935
 Notocypraea Schilder, 1927
 Ovatipsa Iredale, 1931
 Palmadusta Iredale, 1930
 Palmulacypraea Meyer, 2003
 Paradusta Lorenz, 2017 
 † Proadusta Sacco 1894
 Purpuradusta Schilder, 1939
 Ransoniella Dolin & Lozouet, 2005
 Talostolida Iredale, 1931
 Zoila Jousseaume, 1884

Species
For a list of Species in the taxonomic family Cypraeidae, see Cowries.

References

Further reading
 
  Felix Lorenz and Alex Hubert : A Guide to Worldwide Cowries, second revised edition, Conch Books, 2002 
 Lorenz F. (2017). Cowries. A guide to the gastropod family Cypraeidae. Volume 1, Biology and systematics. Harxheim: ConchBooks. 644 pp.

External links 

 Cowrie genetic database project
 Zonatus Gallery

 
Gastropod families
Taxa named by Constantine Samuel Rafinesque